Landis Store is a village in District Township, Berks County, Pennsylvania, United States. It is drained by the West Branch Perkiomen Creek into the Perkiomen Creek in the Green Lane Reservoir. It is split between the Alburtis zip code of 18011, the Barto zip code of 19504, and the Boyertown zip code of 19512.

History
The community derived its name from Samuel Landis, who once kept a store and tavern there. A post office was established at Landis' Store in 1853, and remained in operation until 1956. The post office first opened in Samuel Landis's general store.

References

Unincorporated communities in Berks County, Pennsylvania
Unincorporated communities in Pennsylvania